New York's 44th State Senate district is one of 63 districts in the New York State Senate.

Geography
District 44 is located in the Capital District counties of Albany County and Rensselaer County, including all of Albany and much of Troy.

The district is located in New York's 20th congressional district, and overlaps with the 107th, 108th, 109th, and 110th districts of the New York State Assembly.

Recent election results

2020

2018

2016

2014

2012

Federal results in District 44

References

44